Hasan Sa'id Karmi (1905 – May 5, 2007) was a Palestinian linguist and broadcaster for the BBC Arabic Service.

Biography
Hasan Karmi was born in Tulkarm (then in the Ottoman Empire). The son of a sharia court judge, Sheikh Sa'id al-Karmi, and the brother of the Arab poet Abd al-Karim al-Karmi. Hasan Karmi studied in a local Qur'anic school in Tulkarm and later attended English College in Jerusalem. He joined the British mandate government's education department and won two scholarships, in 1939 and 1945, to study at the Institute of Education in London.

Practical life
Karmi and his family were forced to flee in the 1948 Nakba. They eventually settled in the neighbourhood of Golders Green, in London, United Kingdom. Karmi joined the BBC Arabic Service and worked as a broadcaster for nearly 40 years. He was the creator, writer, and presenter of a weekly literary program called Qawlun ala Qawl (Saying on a Saying) devoted to Arabic poetry and proverbs. The program was the longest running in the history of the BBC Arabic Service. For many years he also wrote a column in Huna London (London Calling), which the embassy in Saudi Arabia used to distribute on behalf of the BBC Arabic Service. In 1969 Karmi was awarded an MBE for services to the BBC.

Karmi was married to a Syrian woman, Amina, had one son, Ziyad, and two daughters, Siham and Ghada Karmi.  He returned to the Middle East, to Jordan, in 1989 and spent his remaining years working on eleven dictionaries, one Arabic-English, the rest English-Arabic.

Death
He died on 5 May 2007 in Amman, Jordan.

Articles
 
Karmi, Ghada: In Search of Fatima: A Palestinian Story   Verso 2002
Marwan Asmar; Remembering Hassan Al Karmi, the Intellectual I knew, Hackwriters.com
Donald Macintyre; Hasan Karmi Broadcaster and lexicographer,  18 May 2007, The Independent

References

1905 births
2007 deaths
Men centenarians
Palestinian academics
Palestinian centenarians
People from Tulkarm
Members of the Order of the British Empire
Palestinian emigrants to the United Kingdom